The men's 200 metres event  at the 1998 European Athletics Indoor Championships was held 28 February–1 March.

Medalists

Results

Heats
First 2 from each heat (Q) and the next 1 fastest (q) qualified for the semifinals.

Semifinals
First 2 from each semifinal qualified directly (Q) for the final.

Final

References

200 metres at the European Athletics Indoor Championships
200